Koech Kiprop (born 1938) is a Kenyan athlete. He competed in the men's decathlon at the 1964 Summer Olympics held in Tokyo, Japan. In 1966, he competed in the men's decathlon at the 1966 British Empire and Commonwealth Games held in Kingston, Jamaica.

References

1938 births
Living people
Athletes (track and field) at the 1964 Summer Olympics
Athletes (track and field) at the 1966 British Empire and Commonwealth Games
Kenyan decathletes
Olympic athletes of Kenya
Place of birth missing (living people)
Commonwealth Games competitors for Kenya